The 2006 Asian Men's Softball Championship was an international softball tournament which featured eight nations which was held from 2–5 November 2006 in Kitakyushu, Japan.

Participants

References

Asian Men's Softball Championship
International softball competitions hosted by Japan
2006 in Japanese sport